Hararria is a monotypic snout moth genus described by George Hampson in 1930. Its single species, Harraria rufipicta, described in the same article, is found in Ethiopia.

References

Endemic fauna of Ethiopia
Phycitinae
Monotypic moth genera
Insects of Ethiopia
Moths of Africa